Madaveli (Dhivehi: މަޑަވެލި) is one of the inhabited islands of Gaafu Dhaalu Atoll. Q1 (island code).

Geography

Madaveli is the third largest  populated island in the Gaafu Dhaalu Atoll. Geographically the island of Madaveli sits on the front of a long reef stretching from Madaveli to Faresmaathodaa and can be tracked on foot in low tide.

History 
While it is unclear as to when people started living in Madaveli, considering the similarity in the dialect spoken in the island Huvadhoo Bas as it is spoken in other islands of the Huvadhu Atoll, it is safe to assume that people started living here as early as civilization in the atoll can be traced. Many generations of people living in Madaveli claim inheritance from a number of other islands including Fuvahmulah. Royal ancestries can be found in the island, the most notable one being descendants of the Royal Household of Karayya Ganduvaru of Fuvahmulah who usually adopt the suffix "dhee dhee" after their name. Other ancesttral families in the island include Mudhin family named after their patriarch who was the local Muaddin and many academics are from this family.

Demography

Governance
Madaveli Council President: Hameez Ahmed (Jumhooree Party candidate) http://madaveli.gov.mv/members/
Madaveli Council Vice President: Azam Mohamed (Jumhooree Party candidate)

Economy
Fishing is the main source of income while few resorts and a domestic airport nearby provides alternative sources of income to the islanders.

Education
There is one school in Madaveli. Madaveli School teaches from LKG to Grade 10 students.

Sports and recreation
Popular sports include football, bashi, volleyball and swimming.

Transport
Madaveli residents travel nearby islands by speed boat, launch and ferry. There is regular ferry (Baahaththari dhoani) from Madaveli to Thinadhoo within six days a week. Speed launches available at request from Madaveli to Thinadhoo or within the atoll. There is regular MTCC ferry within the atoll.

Kaadedhdhoo Airport is situated on a nearby island.

References

Islands of the Maldives